The following lists events that happened during 2006 in Liberia.

Incumbents
President: vacant (until January 16), Ellen Sirleaf Johnson (starting January 16)
Vice President: vacant (until January 16), Joseph Boakai (starting January 16)
Chief Justice: Henry Reed Cooper then Johnnie N. Lewis

Events

March
 March 28 - Former Liberian President Charles Taylor disappears after Nigeria agrees to extradite him to face war crime charges in Sierra Leone.
 March 29 - Charles Taylor is captured after disappearing in Nigeria and is extradited to Sierra Leone.

June
 June 15 - The United Kingdom agrees to jail Charles Taylor if he is convicted, removing a key obstacle to a proposed trial to be held at The Hague under the auspices of the Special Court for Sierra Leone.

References

 
Years of the 21st century in Liberia
2000s in Liberia
Liberia
Liberia